Zion is an unincorporated community along the border of Hillsborough Township and Montgomery Township in Somerset County, New Jersey, United States.

The Rock Brook Bridge in Zion is listed on the National Register of Historic Places.

References

Hillsborough Township, New Jersey
Montgomery Township, New Jersey
Unincorporated communities in Somerset County, New Jersey
Unincorporated communities in New Jersey